Vaksdal is a village in Vaksdal municipality in Vestland county, Norway. The village is located on the southern shore of the Veafjorden, across the fjord from the village of Bruvik which sits on the island of Osterøy. The European route E16 highway goes through the village, as does the Bergen Line, which stops at the Vaksdal Station. Vaksdal Church was built in the village in 1933.

Media gallery

References

Villages in Vestland
Vaksdal